Ophyx bilinea is a moth of the family Erebidae. It is found in New Ireland.

References

Ophyx
Moths described in 1984